Honoka (written: , , ,  or ) is a feminine Japanese given name. Notable people with the name include:

, Japanese television personality, writer and AV actress
, Japanese table tennis player
, Japanese women's footballer
, Japanese voice actress and singer
, Japanese voice actress and singer
, Japanese curler
, Japanese rugby sevens player
, Japanese actress, fashion model and voice actress
, Japanese actress and fashion model

Fictional characters 
, a character in the Dead or Alive video game series
, a character in the manga series Lucky Star
, a character in the anime series The Girl Who Leapt Through Space
, a character in the manga series UQ Holder!
, protagonist of the idol franchise Love Live! School Idol Project
, a character in the manga series Yama no Susume
, a character in the anime series Kiznaiver
, a character in the manga series Kin-iro Mosaic
, a character in the light novel series The Irregular at Magic High School
, a character in the manga series Suzuka
, protagonist of the manga series Chibi Devi!
, protagonist of the manga series Witchcraft Works
, a character in the manga series ReLIFE
, a character in the visual novel True Tears
, co-protagonist of the anime series Futari wa Pretty Cure

Japanese feminine given names